Pogoro-Foulbé is a village in the Rollo Department of Bam Province in northern Burkina Faso. It has a population of 617.

References

Bam Province
Populated places in the Centre-Nord Region